Taruga eques (common names: Günther's whipping frog, montane hour-glass tree-frog) is a species of frog in the family Rhacophoridae. It is endemic to the central hills of Sri Lanka.

Description
Adult males measure  and females  in snout–vent length. It resembles (and has been confused with) Taruga fastigo but has relatively shorter legs, narrower but longer head, an by the absence of the black line that connects the axilla and groin in Taruga fastigo, or that line being reduced to a band of blackish dots. Taruga eques can be differentiated from the species included to the same genus with the presence of Calcar on the heel.

Habitat and conservation
It is both arboreal and terrestrial, being found in the canopy and on tree trunks as well as in grasses at the edge of ponds. The tadpoles occur in both permanent and seasonal ponds. It does not occur in modified habitats. While a common species, it is threatened by habitat loss caused by the conversion of forest to agricultural use, forestry, fires, and infrastructure development. It is present in the Horton Plains National Park, Hakgala Strict Nature Reserve, and the Peak Wilderness Sanctuary.

Polymorphism
Polymorphism is defined as “arising of two or more distinct forms simultaneously in the same habitat of a  species in such proportions that the rarest of them cannot be maintained by recurrent mutation’’.

Gallery

References

eques
Frogs of Sri Lanka
Endemic fauna of Sri Lanka
Taxa named by Albert Günther
Amphibians described in 1858
Taxonomy articles created by Polbot